Mickey Rooney Jr. (July 3, 1945 – July 16, 2022) was an American actor. He was the eldest son of the actor Mickey Rooney, and operated the Rooney Entertainment Group, a film and television production company. He was a born-again Christian who had an evangelical ministry in Hemet, California.

Early life and career
Rooney was born on July 3, 1945, in Birmingham, Alabama, to actor Mickey Rooney (1920–2014) and a past Miss Birmingham and singer Betty Jane Rase (1927–2002).

After appearing as a "Mouseketeer" in The Mickey Mouse Club in 1955 along with his brother Tim, he played his first film role in 1967 in Hot Rods to Hell. He later appeared in the television film Beyond the Bermuda Triangle in 1975 and in the film Honeysuckle Rose in 1980.

Personal life and death
Rooney once was married to Playboy Playmate of the Month, Merci Montello. Rooney met Laura Hollander in 1986 and they married on December 30, 1986. They were married until her death in 2006.

Rooney died at his home in Glendale, Arizona, on July 16, 2022 at age 77.

Filmography

Film

Television

References

External links

 

1945 births
2022 deaths
20th-century American male actors
21st-century American male actors
American evangelicals
American male film actors
American male television actors
Male actors from Birmingham, Alabama
Mouseketeers
Musicians from Birmingham, Alabama
People from Hemet, California